Desnoyers is a surname. Notable people with the surname include:

Auguste Gaspard Louis Desnoyers (1800–1887), French engraver
Daniel Desnoyers, Canadian radio host and DJ
Jules Desnoyers (1800–1887), French geologist and archaeologist
Luc Desnoyers (born 1950), Canadian politician
Peter J. Desnoyers (1772–1846), Detroit silversmith and businessman
Peter Desnoyers (1800–1880), Detroit businessman and politician

See also
Charles Desnoyer (1806–1858), French actor, playwright and theatre manager